Quigley Down Under is a 1990 western film directed by Simon Wincer and starring Tom Selleck, Alan Rickman, and Laura San Giacomo.

Plot
Matthew Quigley is an American cowboy with a specially modified rifle with which he can shoot accurately at extraordinary distances. Seeing a newspaper advertisement that asks for a man with his special talent, he answers using just four words: "M. Quigley 900 yards", written on a copy of the advertisement that is punctured by six closely spaced bullet holes.

When he arrives in Australia, then part of the British Empire, he gets into a fight with employees of the man who hired him as they try to force "Crazy Cora" onto their wagon. After he identifies himself, he is taken to the station of Elliot Marston, who informs Quigley his sharpshooting skills will be used to eradicate the increasingly elusive Aboriginal Australians. Quigley turns down the offer and throws Marston out of his own house. When the Aboriginal manservant knocks Quigley over the head, Marston's men beat him and Cora unconscious and dump them in the Outback with no water and little chance of survival. However, they are rescued by Aborigines.

Cora now reveals that she comes from Texas. When her home was attacked by Comanches, she hid in the root cellar and accidentally suffocated her child while trying to prevent him from crying. Her husband had then put her alone on a ship to Australia. Now Cora consistently calls Quigley by her husband's name (Roy), much to his annoyance.

When Marston's men attack the Aborigines who helped them, Quigley kills three. Escaping on a single horse, they encounter more of the men driving Aborigines over a cliff. Quigley drives them off with his deadly shooting and Cora rescues an orphaned baby she finds among the dead. Leaving Cora and the infant in the desert with food and water, Quigley rides alone to a nearby town. There he obtains new ammunition from a local German gunsmith, who hates Marston for his murdering ways. Quigley learns as well that he has become a legendary hero among the Aborigines.

Marston's men are also in town and recognize Quigley's saddle. When they attack, cornering him in a burning building, he escapes through a skylight and kills all but one of them. The injured survivor is sent back to say Quigley will be following. But first Quigley returns to Cora and the baby, which she has just saved from an attack by dingoes. She had tried to stop that child from crying too, but finally let him make as much noise as he liked as she killed the animals using a revolver that Quigley had left for her. Back in town, Cora gives the baby to Aborigines trading there after Quigley tells her that she (Cora) has a right to happiness.

Next morning, Quigley rides away to confront Marston at his station. At first he shoots the defenders from his location in the hills, but is eventually shot in the leg and captured by Marston's last two men. Marston, who has noticed that Quigley only ever carries a rifle, decides to give him a lesson in the "quick-draw" style of gunfighting. However, Marston and his men are beaten to the draw by Quigley; as Marston lies dying, Quigley refers to an earlier conversation, telling him, "I said I never had much use for one [a revolver]; never said I didn't know how to use it."

Marston's servant comes out of the house and gives Quigley his rifle back, then walks away from the ranch, stripping off his western-style clothing as he goes. An army troop now arrives to arrest Quigley, until they notice the surrounding hills are lined with Aborigines and decide to withdraw. Later Quigley and Cora book a passage back to America in the name of Cora's husband, since Quigley is still wanted. On the wharf, she reminds him that he once told her that she had to say two words before he could make love to her. Smiling broadly, she calls him "Matthew Quigley" and the two embrace for the first time.

Cast
 Tom Selleck as Matthew Quigley
 Laura San Giacomo as Crazy Cora
 Alan Rickman as Elliott Marston
 Chris Haywood as Major Ashley-Pitt
 Ron Haddrick as Grimmelman
 Tony Bonner as Dobkin
 Jerome Ehlers as Coogan
 Conor McDermottroe as Hobb
 Roger Ward as Brophy
 Ben Mendelsohn as O'Flynn
 Steve Dodd as Kunkurra
 Karen Davitt as Slattern
 Kylie Foster as Slattern
 William Zappa as Reilly
 Jonathan Sweet as Sergeant Thomas
 Ollie Hall as Carver

Production

Development
John Hill first began writing Quigley Down Under in 1974. He was inspired by a Los Angeles Times article about the genocide of the aborigines in 19th-century Australia. Although Westerns were in decline in the 1970s, Hill said that the script "opened a lot of doors for me," and led to other assignments.

The script was first optioned in 1979 by producer Mort Engelberg for Steve McQueen, with whom he teamed on The Hunter; however McQueen died of cancer shortly after completing The Hunter. The script was bought by CBS Theatrical Films where it was attached to director Rick Rosenthal. It then went to Warner Bros with Tom Selleck to star and Lewis Gilbert to direct around 1987. Warner Bros had the script for three years but then dropped their option. The script then became the subject of bidding between Pathe Entertainment, Disney and Warner Bros. It sold to Pathé for $250,000 which Hill said "is pretty good, when you consider that for 15 years I'd been making money optioning and rewriting that screenplay."

Pathé's then head of production, Alan Ladd Jr., agreed to commit a $20 million budget. Selleck agreed to star and the director was an Australian, Simon Wincer.

Wincer felt a good story had been ruined by numerous rewrites from people who knew little about Australian history, so he brought on Ian Jones as writer. They went back to the original draft, re-set it from the 1880s to the 1860s and made it more historically accurate.

Shooting
The firearm used by Quigley (Selleck) is a custom 13.5 pound (6 kg), single-shot, 1874 Sharps Rifle, with a 34-inch (860 mm) barrel. The rifle used for filming was a replica manufactured for the film by the Shiloh Rifle Manufacturing Company of Big Timber, Montana. In 2002 Selleck donated the rifle, along with six other firearms from his other films, to the National Rifle Association, as part of the NRA's exhibit "Real Guns of Reel Heroes" at the National Firearms Museum in Fairfax, Virginia.

The film was shot entirely in Australia. Scenes were filmed in and around Warrnambool and Apollo Bay, Victoria.

Although several scenes of the story depict violence and cruelty toward and involving animals, a film spokesperson explained that no animal was harmed, and special effects were used. For example, Quigley and Cora are reduced to consuming "grub worms" (actually blobs of dough) for survival. A pack of dingoes attacks Cora, and she finally saves herself by shooting the animals. Those animals were specially trained, and were actually "playing" for that scene, which was later enhanced by visual and sound effects. Several scenes involve falling horses; they were performed by specially-trained animals and were not hurt. When a horse falls off a cliff, the "horse" was a mechanical creation. The film's producer stated that a veterinarian was on the set whenever animals were being used in filming.

Reception
Critical responses were mixed, with Quigley having a 55% rating on Rotten Tomatoes from 20 reviews. Roger Ebert of The Chicago Sun-Times gave the film two-and-a-half out of four stars, writing it was a well-made but formulaic neo-western. He particularly praised the performances of Rickman and San Giacomo, saying "[T]his may be the movie that proves her staying power."

The film, however, was not a financial success in theaters, roughly recouping its budget.

The film, and, more specifically, the protagonist's skill with his rifle, has led snipers to refer to the act of killing two targets with a single bullet as "a Quigley".

Awards and nominations

See also

 Cinema of Australia

References

External links
Quigley Down Under at Oz Movies
 
 
 
 
 

1990 films
1990 Western (genre) films
1990s adventure drama films
Australian drama films
Australian Western (genre) films
Films set in Western Australia
Films set in colonial Australia
Films shot in Victoria (Australia)
1990s English-language films
Films scored by Basil Poledouris
Films directed by Simon Wincer
Metro-Goldwyn-Mayer films
Films set in the Outback
1990 drama films